The Saxon Spot (German: Sächsische Schnippe) is a breed of fancy pigeon. Saxon Spots, along with other varieties of domesticated pigeons, are all descendants of the rock dove (Columba livia).

Appearance 
The Saxon Spot comes in four color varieties: black, blue, red and yellow. The signature characteristic of the breed is a coloured spot on the top of their head. Their neck is short and their beak is long, with the upper beak being dark blue. The Saxon Spot's feet are well muffed. Their back is broad and their wings rest on the top of the birds tail

Origin 
The Saxon Spot originated in Saxony.

See also 
List of pigeon breeds
Saxon Shield
Saxon Monk

References

External links 
Saxon Spot Standard http://www.azpigeons.org/saxonspot.htm

Pigeon breeds
Pigeon breeds originating in Germany